Habyarimana is a Rwandan surname. Notable people with the surname include:

Juvénal Habyarimana (1937–1994), president of Rwanda 1973–1994
Agathe Habyarimana (née Kanziga, born 1942), wife of Juvénal Habyarimana
Emmanuel Habyarimana, former Rwandan Minister of Defence